Michael "Mick" Foley is an Irish Gaelic footballer from Kildare who plays for his local club, Athy. He also played hurling with Kildare.

He plays full back for the Kildare senior inter-county team since making his senior debut in 2004. In 2011, he was selected as a member of Football All-Star team.

He was captain of the Athy Senior Football team who won the Kildare County Championship in 2011.

Honours
Kildare Senior Football Championship (2): 2011 (c) 2020
Leinster Under-21 Football Championship (1): 2004
National Football League Division 2 (1): 2012
O'Byrne Cup (2): 2011, 2013
All-Star (1): 2011
Kildare Senior Football League Division 2 2009 
Kildare senior football league division 1 2018

References

External links 
  Foley at gaainfo.com

Living people
Athy Gaelic footballers
Dual players
Kildare inter-county Gaelic footballers
Athy hurlers
Kildare inter-county hurlers
Year of birth missing (living people)